Bouldnor is a hamlet near Yarmouth on the west coast of the Isle of Wight in southern England. It is the location of Bouldnor Battery, a gun battery emplacement.

Bouldnor is located on the A3054 road, and public transport is provided by buses on Southern Vectis route 7.

A soapbox derby was held in Bouldnor in 2005. It was a big success, so the event was repeated in 2006, though moved to Newport and renamed the Isle of Wight Soapbox Derby Challenge.

The Bouldnor Cliff Mesolithic Village seaport 

The Bouldnor Cliff Mesolithic Village is an internationally important archaeological site underwater off the coast of the Bouldnor Cliffs. Mesolithic flints and other items have been found. This material dates from 8000 years ago. During the Neolithic, this was a seaport that supported trade with the Middle East (as wheat was present here 8,000 years ago, hundreds of years before wheat was grown anywhere in Europe). Bronze Age Britain had large reserves of tin in the areas of Cornwall and Devon. Mining in Cornwall and Devon was then of global importance. Tin is necessary to smelt bronze. At that time the sea level was much lower and carts of tin were brought across the Solent at low tide for export from Bouldnor, possibly on the Ferriby Boats and later on the Blackfriars Ships.

References

Hamlets on the Isle of Wight